Jamakuh (also Romanized as Jamākūh) is a village in Saheli-ye Jokandan Rural District, in the Central District of Talesh County, Gilan Province, Iran. At the 2006 census, its population was 623, in 151 families.

References 

Populated places in Talesh County